James Arthur Bradley (March 16, 1952 – February 20, 1982) was an American basketball player.

Early life and education
Bradley was born and raised in East Chicago, Indiana. He was a star athlete at Roosevelt High School. In 1970, he led the East Chicago Roosevelt Roughriders to the Indiana Boys State Basketball title; in 1972, he was named the MVP of the Midwestern Conference. He played collegiately for nearby Northern Illinois University.

Career
Bradley was selected by the Los Angeles Lakers in the third round (48th pick overall) of the 1974 NBA draft. He played for the Kentucky Colonels (1973–75) and Denver Nuggets (1975–76) in the American Basketball Association (ABA) for 98 games. Bradley finished his career with the Rochester Zeniths of the Continental Basketball Association (CBA) from 1978 to 1981.

Death
In 1982, Bradley was found dead at age 29 in an alley in Portland, Oregon. The police later determined that he was shot in the back in a drug-related deal.

See also
 List of NCAA Division I men's basketball players with 30 or more rebounds in a game

References

External links

 College statistics @ sports-reference.com

1952 births
1982 deaths
1982 murders in the United States
American expatriate basketball people in the Philippines
American men's basketball players
American murder victims
Barangay Ginebra San Miguel players
Basketball players from Indiana
Deaths by firearm in Oregon
Denver Nuggets players
Forwards (basketball)
Kentucky Colonels players
Los Angeles Lakers draft picks
Male murder victims
Northern Illinois Huskies men's basketball players
Parade High School All-Americans (boys' basketball)
People murdered in Oregon
Philippine Basketball Association imports
Rochester Zeniths players
Sportspeople from East Chicago, Indiana